Ted A. Bohus is an American film director, producer, actor and writer. He is best known for his work in low-budget independent films, most often in the horror genre.

His first film work was with the 1980s horror title Fiend where he acted as producer. He then produced two more horror movies, Nightbeast and Return of the Aliens:The Deadly Spawn, before he made his directorial debut with Regenerated Man in 1994. Ted also either produced, directed or wrote, Vampire Vixens From Venus, Fantastic Filmshow I & II, Generation X, This Thing of Ours and Destination Fame.

Bohus is also the editor and publisher of SPFX Magazine, a journal devoted to classic special-effects movies in the horror, science-fiction and fantasy genres.  The fanzine had been started by El Paso effects fan Jay Duncan and Bohus in the 1970s; Bohus resurrected the title 20 years later and continues publishing it on an irregular basis. He also works on other magazines, including Monster Bash, Horror Biz, Monster Mania and Monsterpalooza.

Filmography

As producer
1. Fiend (1980)
2. Nightbeast (1982)
3. Return of the Aliens:The Deadly Spawn (1983)
4. Metamorphosis: The Alien Factor'''(1990)
5. Regenerated Man (1994)
6. This Thing of Ours (2003)
7. Destination Fame (2004)

As director
1. Regenerated Man (1994)
2. Vampire Vixens from Venus (1995)
3. Destination Fame (2004)
4. This Thing Of Ours (2003)
5. Hell on Earth (2008)

As actor
1. Return of the Aliens:The Deadly Spawn (1993) ... Medic #1
2. The Amityville Curse (V) (1990) ... Ghoul
3. Regenerated Man (1994)   ... Thug
4. Vampire Vixens From Venus (1995)   ... Man in Jeep
5. This Thing of Ours'' (2003) ... Teddy Alexander

References

External links
 Official site
 
 SPFX Magazine official site
 Interview with Ted A. Bohus
 WTF Films review of THE DEADLY SPAWN blu-ray
 WTF Films review of THE DEADLY SPAWN blu-ray re-release

American film directors
Living people
Year of birth missing (living people)